The Fencing competition in the 2003 Summer Universiade were held in Daegu, South Korea.

Medal overview

Men's events

Women's events

Medal table

References
 Universiade fencing medalists on HickokSports

2003 Summer Universiade
Universiade
2003
International fencing competitions hosted by South Korea